Juracrista is an extinct genus of squat lobster in the family Munididae. It was extant during the Jurassic Period, as the name suggests. It contains the following species:
 Juracrista costaspinosa Robins et al. 2012
 Juracrista perculta Robins et al. 2012

References

Squat lobsters